Duncan Clark is the name of:

 Duncan Clark (athlete) (1915–2003), Scottish Olympic athlete
 Duncan Clark, Chairman of BDA China Limited
 Duncan W. Clark (1910–2007), American public health expert and preventive medicine specialist
 Duncan Clark (surgeon) (1759–1808), loyalist in Halifax, Nova Scotia